The supraspinous ligament, also known as the supraspinal ligament, is a ligament found along the vertebral column.

Structure
The supraspinous ligament connects the tips of the spinous processes from the seventh cervical vertebra to the sacrum. Above the seventh cervical vertebra, the supraspinous ligament is continuous with the nuchal ligament.

Between the spinous processes it is continuous with the interspinous ligaments.

It is thicker and broader in the lumbar than in the thoracic region, and intimately blended, in both situations, with the neighboring fascia.

The most superficial fibers of this ligament extend over three or four vertebrae; those more deeply seated pass between two or three vertebrae while the deepest connect the spinous processes of neighboring vertebrae.

Development

Function
The supraspinous ligament, along with the posterior longitudinal ligament, interspinous ligaments and ligamentum flavum, help to limit hyperflexion of the vertebral column.

Clinical significance 
Lesions to the supraspinous ligament may result in palpable thickening. Ultrasound  is effective for detecting lesions. A strain injury can also damage the supraspinous ligament.

The supraspinous ligament creates resistance during midline epidural anaesthetics when the needle is being inserted. This increased resistance needs to be taken into account, and is one of the first subcutaneous tissues.

See also

References

Ligaments of the torso
Bones of the vertebral column
Ligaments